Below is the list of subcamps of Herzogenbusch complex (Konzentrationslager Herzogenbusch) of Nazi concentration camps, in Dutch known as Kamp Vught.

 Amersfoort or Polizeiliches Durchgangslager Amersfoort
 Arnhem
 Breda (Gilze-Rijen Air Base)
 Eindhoven (Eindhoven Airport)
 Haaren
 's-Hertogenbosch (Continental AG factory)
 Leeuwarden (Leeuwarden Air Base)
 Moerdijk
 Roosendaal (Landbouwschool)
 The Hague
 Sint-Michielsgestel
 Valkenburg
 Venlo (Venlo Air Base)
 Zutphen

See also
 List of Nazi-German concentration camps

External links
 Kamp Amersfoort official website, in Dutch, English and Polish
 Documentary film about Konzentrationslager Herzogenbusch

Herzogenbusch concentration camp
Nazi SS
Herzogenbusch
Herzogenbusch